Vítor Hugo de Almeida Tavares (born 30 January 1999) known as Vitinha, is a Portuguese professional footballer who plays as a defender for Amora.

Career
Vitinha made his professional debut for Penafiel on 14 September 2020 in the Liga Portugal 2.

References

External links

1999 births
Sportspeople from Aveiro District
Living people
Portuguese footballers
Association football defenders
S.C. Espinho players
Lusitânia F.C. players
F.C. Penafiel players
Amora F.C. players
Campeonato de Portugal (league) players
Liga Portugal 2 players